First-seeded Daphne Akhurst defeated Louie Bickerton 6–1, 5–7, 6–2, in the final to win the women's singles tennis title at the 1929 Australian Championships.

Seeds
The seeded players are listed below. Daphne Akhurst is the champion; others show the round in which they were eliminated.

 Daphne Akhurst (champion)
 Louie Bickerton (finalist)
 Marjorie Cox (semifinals)
 Sylvia Harper (semifinals)
 Meryl O'Hara Wood (quarterfinals)
 Mall Molesworth (quarterfinals)
 Kathleen Le Messurier (quarterfinals)
 Birdie Bond (first round)

Draw

Key
 Q = Qualifier
 WC = Wild card
 LL = Lucky loser
 r = Retired

Finals

Earlier rounds

Section 1

Section 2

Notes

 Possibly Vera Lucy Mathias.

External links
 
  Source for seedings

1929 in women's tennis
1929
1929 in Australian tennis
1929 in Australian women's sport
Women's Singles